Pryser is a Norwegian surname. Notable people with the surname include:

Thoralf Pryser (1885–1970), Norwegian journalist and newspaper editor
Tore Pryser (born 1945), Norwegian historian

Norwegian-language surnames